There are about 760 known moth species of Malawi. The moths (mostly nocturnal) and butterflies (mostly diurnal) together make up the taxonomic order Lepidoptera. They are listed alphabetically by family.

This is a list of moth species which have been recorded in Malawi.

Adelidae
Ceromitia glandularis Meyrick, 1908

Anomoeotidae
Thermochrous exigua Talbot, 1932
Thermochrous melanoneura Hampson, 1920

Arctiidae
Acantharctia aurivillii Bartel, 1903
Acantharctia lacteata Rothschild, 1933
Acantharctia nigrivena Rothschild, 1935
Acantharctia tenuifasciata Hampson, 1910
Acanthofrontia dicycla Hampson, 1918
Afrowatsonius marginalis (Walker, 1855)
Agylla complanodes Hampson, 1901
Alpenus investigatorum (Karsch, 1898)
Alpenus nigropunctata (Bethune-Baker, 1908)
Amata cerbera (Linnaeus, 1764)
Amata ceres (Oberthür, 1878)
Amerila affinis (Rothschild, 1910)
Amerila bubo (Walker, 1855)
Amerila carneola (Hampson, 1916)
Amerila puella (Fabricius, 1793)
Amphicallia bellatrix (Dalman, 1823)
Amphicallia thelwalli (Druce, 1882)
Amsacta grammiphlebia Hampson, 1901
Amsacta latimarginalis Rothschild, 1933
Amsacta marginalis Walker, 1855
Anaemosia albida Hampson, 1918
Apisa grisescens (Dufrane, 1945)
Apisa rendalli Rothschild, 1910
Apothosia conformis Hampson, 1918
Archilema uelleburgensis (Strand, 1912)
Archithosia costimacula (Mabille, 1878)
Argina amanda (Boisduval, 1847)
Argina leonina (Walker, 1865)
Binna penicillata Walker, 1865
Carcinopodia furcifasciata (Butler, 1895)
Caripodia consimilis Hampson, 1918
Ctenosia nephelistis Hampson, 1918
Cyana nyasica (Hampson, 1918)
Cyana pretoriae (Distant, 1897)
Cyana rejecta (Walker, 1854)
Eilema albuliferella Strand, 1922
Eilema aurantisquamata (Hampson, 1918)
Eilema nebuliferella Strand, 1922
Eilema sanguicosta (Hampson, 1901)
Estigmene trivitta (Walker, 1855)
Eurozonosia atricincta Hampson, 1918
Eurozonosia inconstans (Butler, 1896)
Eyralpenus diplosticta (Hampson, 1900)
Eyralpenus inconspicua (Rothschild, 1910)
Eyralpenus melanocera (Hampson, 1916)
Galtara aurivilii (Pagenstecher, 1901)
Galtara doriae (Oberthür, 1880)
Ilemodes heterogyna Hampson, 1900
Ischnarctia brunnescens Bartel, 1903
Karschiola holoclera (Karsch, 1894)
Lepidilema unipectinata Aurivillius, 1910
Lepista pandula (Boisduval, 1847)
Macrosia chalybeata Hampson, 1901
Metarctia collocalia Kiriakoff, 1957
Metarctia hebenoides (Kiriakoff, 1973)
Metarctia lateritia Herrich-Schäffer, 1855
Metarctia rubra (Walker, 1856)
Micralarctia punctulatum (Wallengren, 1860)
Nyctemera apicalis (Walker, 1854)
Nyctemera itokina (Aurivillius, 1904)
Nyctemera leuconoe Hopffer, 1857
Ochrota nyassa (Strand, 1912)
Paralacydes ramosa (Hampson, 1907)
Pelosia plumosa (Mabille, 1900)
Poecilarctia venata Aurivillius, 1921
Pseudlepista holoxantha Hampson, 1918
Pseudmelisa rubrosignata Kiriakoff, 1957
Pusiola holoxantha (Hampson, 1918)
Pusiola nyassana (Strand, 1912)
Pusiola ochreata (Hampson, 1901)
Secusio mania Druce, 1887
Secusio strigata Walker, 1854
Spilosoma baxteri (Rothschild, 1910)
Spilosoma bipartita Rothschild, 1933
Spilosoma karschi Bartel, 1903
Spilosoma lineata Walker, 1855
Spilosoma nigrocastanea (Rothschild, 1917)
Spilosoma nyasana Rothschild, 1933
Spilosoma nyasica (Hampson, 1911)
Stenilema aurantiaca Hampson, 1909
Stenilema subaurantiaca Strand, 1912
Teracotona euprepia Hampson, 1900
Teracotona mirabilis Bartel, 1903
Teracotona trifasciata Bartel, 1903
Thumatha inconstans (Butler, 1897)
Thyretes negus Oberthür, 1878
Thyrogonia cyaneotincta Hampson, 1918
Utetheisa pulchella (Linnaeus, 1758)

Coleophoridae
Holcocera lignyodes (Meyrick, 1914)

Cosmopterigidae
Macrobathra proxena Meyrick, 1914

Cossidae
Alophonotus rauana
Azygophleps inclusa (Walker, 1856)
Brachylia nussi Yakovlev, 2011
Eulophonotus stephania
Macrocossus grebennikovi Yakovlev, 2013
Meharia murphyi Yakovlev, 2013
Oreocossus occidentalis
Phragmataecia innominata Dalla Torre, 1923
Phragmataecia irrorata Hampson, 1910
Strigocossus elephas Yakovlev, 2013
Strigocossus moderatus (Walker, 1856)
Strigocossus capensis (Walker, 1856)
Xyleutes stephania (Druce, 1887)

Crambidae
Adelpherupa albescens Hampson, 1919
Adelpherupa flavescens Hampson, 1919
Agathodes musivalis Guenée, 1854
Aurotalis delicatalis (Hampson, 1919)
Bissetia poliella (Hampson, 1919)
Cadarena sinuata (Fabricius, 1781)
Calamoschoena stictalis Hampson, 1919
Charltona atrifascialis Hampson, 1919
Chilo argyropasta (Hampson, 1919)
Chilo costifusalis (Hampson, 1919)
Chilo orichalcociliella (Strand, 1911)
Classeya bicuspidalis (Hampson, 1919)
Conotalis nigroradians (Mabille, 1900)
Cotachena smaragdina (Butler, 1875)
Crambus brachiiferus Hampson, 1919
Crambus brunneisquamatus Hampson, 1919
Crambus diarhabdellus Hampson, 1919
Crambus microstrigatus Hampson, 1919
Crambus monostictus Hampson, 1919
Crambus neurellus Hampson, 1919
Crambus vittiterminellus Hampson, 1919
Donacoscaptes flavilinealis (Hampson, 1919)
Euclasta varii Popescu-Gorj & Constantinescu, 1973
Haimbachia rufifusalis (Hampson, 1919)
Haimbachia rufistrigalis (Hampson, 1919)
Heliothela ophideresana (Walker, 1863)
Nomophila noctuella ([Denis & Schiffermüller], 1775)
Orphanostigma excisa (Martin, 1956)
Orphanostigma fervidalis (Zeller, 1852)
Ostrinia erythrialis (Hampson, 1913)
Parancyla argyrothysana Hampson, 1919
Parapoynx stagnalis (Zeller, 1852)
Parerupa undilinealis (Hampson, 1919)
Patissa fulvicepsalis Hampson, 1919
Patissa geminalis Hampson, 1919
Patissa rubrilinealis Hampson, 1919
Patissa termipunctalis (Hampson, 1919)
Prionotalis peracutella Hampson, 1919
Prochoristis calamochroa (Hampson, 1919)
Pyrausta distictalis Hampson, 1918
Sebrus perdentellus (Hampson, 1919)

Drepanidae
Gonoreta subtilis (Bryk, 1913)
Negera unispinosa Watson, 1965

Elachistidae
Elachista chelonitis Meyrick, 1909
Elachista semophanta Meyrick, 1914

Eupterotidae
Hibrildes crawshayi Butler, 1896
Hibrildes norax Druce, 1887
Hoplojana tripunctata (Aurivillius, 1897)
Janomima dannfelti (Aurivillius, 1893)
Stenoglene bipunctatus (Aurivillius, 1909)
Stenoglene obtusus (Walker, 1864)
Stenoglene roseus (Druce, 1886)

Geometridae
Acollesis mimetica Prout, 1915
Antozola dislocata Herbulot, 1992
Asthenotricha serraticornis Warren, 1902
Biston stringeri (Prout, 1938)
Callioratis abraxas Felder, 1874
Cartaletis libyssa (Hopffer, 1857)
Cartaletis nigricosta (Prout, 1916)
Chiasmia getula (Wallengren, 1872)
Chiasmia inconspicua (Warren, 1897)
Chiasmia infabricata (Prout, 1934)
Chiasmia johnstoni (Butler, 1893)
Chiasmia kilimanjarensis (Holland, 1892)
Chiasmia majestica (Warren, 1901)
Chiasmia parallacta (Warren, 1897)
Chiasmia procidata (Guenée, 1858)
Chiasmia rhabdophora (Holland, 1892)
Chiasmia subcurvaria (Mabille, 1897)
Chiasmia umbratilis (Butler, 1875)
Chloroclystis consocer Prout, 1937
Chloroclystis muscosa (Warren, 1902)
Chrysocraspeda zombensis (Prout, 1932)
Cleora munda (Warren, 1899)
Cleora rostella D. S. Fletcher, 1967
Cleora thyris D. S. Fletcher, 1967
Cophophlebia olivata Warren, 1897
Derambila delostigma Prout, 1915
Derambila hyperphyes (Prout, 1911)
Dithecodes ornithospila (Prout, 1911)
Drepanogynis unilineata (Warren, 1897)
Ectropis gozmanyi D. S. Fletcher, 1978
Epigynopteryx maeviaria (Guenée, 1858)
Ereunetea reussi Gaede, 1914
Eulycia grisea (Warren, 1897)
Horisme pallidimacula Prout, 1925
Idaea angusta (Butler, 1897)
Idaea exquisita (Warren, 1897)
Idaea lilliputaria (Warren, 1902)
Idaea tornivestis (Prout, 1932)
Idiodes flexilinea (Warren, 1898)
Isturgia catalaunaria (Guenée, 1858)
Mauna electa Prout, 1917
Nothofidonia irregularis Prout, 1915
Omizodes rubrifasciata (Butler, 1896)
Pareclipsis anophthalma Prout, 1916
Petovia marginata Walker, 1854
Piercia prasinaria (Warren, 1901)
Pitthea neavei Prout, 1915
Prasinocyma neavei Prout, 1912
Prasinocyma vermicularia (Guenée, 1858)
Rhodophthitus roseovittata (Butler, 1895)
Rhodophthitus simplex Warren, 1897
Rhodophthitus tricoloraria (Mabille, 1890)
Scopula erinaria (Swinhoe, 1904)
Scopula internata (Guenée, 1857)
Scopula isomala Prout, 1932
Scopula lathraea Prout, 1922
Scopula nigrinotata (Warren, 1897)
Scopula oenoloma Prout, 1932
Scopula opicata (Fabricius, 1798)
Scopula serena Prout, 1920
Scopula sublobata (Warren, 1898)
Scopula supina Prout, 1920
Scotopteryx nictitaria (Herrich-Schäffer, 1855)
Somatina virginalis Prout, 1917
Syncollesis coerulea (Warren, 1896)
Terina circumcincta Prout, 1915
Terina puncticorpus Warren, 1897
Thalassodes albifimbria Warren, 1897
Trimetopia aetheraria Guenée, 1858
Xanthisthisa tarsispina (Warren, 1901)
Xanthorhoe exorista Prout, 1922
Xanthorhoe latigrisea (Warren, 1897)
Xanthorhoe transjugata Prout, 1923
Zamarada acosmeta Prout, 1921
Zamarada adumbrata D. S. Fletcher, 1974
Zamarada aequilumata D. S. Fletcher, 1974
Zamarada bathyscaphes Prout, 1912
Zamarada crystallophana Mabille, 1900
Zamarada denticatella Prout, 1922
Zamarada dentigera Warren, 1909
Zamarada euphrosyne Oberthür, 1912
Zamarada excavata Bethune-Baker, 1913
Zamarada flavicaput Warren, 1901
Zamarada gamma D. S. Fletcher, 1958
Zamarada glareosa Bastelberger, 1909
Zamarada ignicosta Prout, 1912
Zamarada metrioscaphes Prout, 1912
Zamarada nasuta Warren, 1897
Zamarada plana Bastelberger, 1909
Zamarada prolata D. S. Fletcher, 1974
Zamarada purimargo Prout, 1912
Zamarada rufilinearia Swinhoe, 1904
Zamarada scintillans Bastelberger, 1909
Zamarada seydeli D. S. Fletcher, 1974
Zamarada vulpina Warren, 1897

Glyphipterigidae
Chrysocentris clavaria Meyrick 1914

Gracillariidae
Acrocercops bifasciata (Walsingham, 1891)
Africephala timaea (Meyrick, 1914)

Himantopteridae
Semioptila dolicholoba Hampson, 1920
Semioptila trogoloba Hampson, 1920

Immidae
Imma steganota Meyrick, 1914

Lasiocampidae
Bombycopsis metallicus (Distant, 1898)
Braura ligniclusa (Walker, 1865)
Catalebeda intermedia Aurivillius, 1925
Catalebeda jamesoni (Bethune-Baker, 1908)
Cleopatrina phocea (Druce, 1887)
Epicnapteroides lobata Strand, 1912
Epitrabala nyassana (Aurivillius, 1909)
Eutricha morosa (Walker, 1865)
Euwallengrenia reducta (Walker, 1855)
Filiola lanceolata (Hering, 1932)
Gonometa regia Aurivillius, 1905
Grellada marshalli (Aurivillius, 1902)
Lechriolepis pulchra Aurivillius, 1905
Leipoxais philapseudia Hering, 1928
Mallocampa audea (Druce, 1887)
Mallocampa cornutiventris Tams, 1929
Marmonna marmorata Zolotuhin & Prozorov, 2010
Marmonna murphyi Zolotuhin & Prozorov, 2010
Morongea elfiora Zolotuhin & Prozorov, 2010
Nirbiana obscura (Hering, 1941)
Odontocheilopteryx dollmani Tams, 1930
Odontocheilopteryx pattersoni Tams, 1926
Odontogama superba (Aurivillius, 1914)
Pachymeta capreolus Aurivillius, 1914
Pachymetana neavei (Aurivillius, 1915)
Pachytrina verba Zolotuhin & Gurkovich, 2009
Pallastica mesoleuca (Strand, 1911)
Pallastica pyrsocoma (Tams, 1936)
Philotherma brunnea (Aurivillius, 1908)
Philotherma fusca Aurivillius, 1908
Philotherma media Aurivillius, 1909
Philotherma sordida Aurivillius, 1905
Pseudolyra cervina (Aurivillius, 1905)
Stenophatna cymographa (Hampson, 1910)
Stenophatna hollandi (Tams, 1929)
Stenophatna rothschildi (Tams, 1936)
Stoermeriana congoense (Aurivillius, 1908)
Stoermeriana distinguenda (Aurivillius, 1905)
Stoermeriana fusca (Aurivillius, 1905)
Stoermeriana graberi (Dewitz, 1881)
Stoermeriana sjostedti (Aurivillius, 1902)
Streblote nyassanum (Strand, 1912)
Theophasida superba (Aurivillius, 1914)
Trabala charon Druce, 1910

Lecithoceridae
Timyra aeolocoma Meyrick, 1939

Lemoniidae
Sabalia fulleborni Karsch, 1900
Sabalia fulvicincta Hampson, 1901

Limacodidae
Afraltha xanthocharis (Clench, 1955)
Crothaema gloriosa Hering, 1928
Halseyia rectilinea (Hering, 1937)
Latoia albifrons Guérin-Méneville, 1844
Macroplectra flavata West, 1940
Parapluda incincta (Hampson, 1909)
Parasa tamara Hering, 1828
Scotinochroa inconsequens Butler, 1897
Taeda gemmans (Felder, 1874)
Taeda prasina Butler, 1896
Tryphax incurvata West, 1940

Lymantriidae
Aroa discalis Walker, 1855
Barlowia charax (Druce, 1896)
Bracharoa charax (Druce, 1896)
Bracharoa quadripunctata (Wallengren, 1875)
Chrysocyma mesopotamia Hampson, 1905
Cropera stilpnaroma Hering, 1926
Crorema fulvinotata (Butler, 1893)
Dasychira ophthalmodes Hering, 1926
Euproctis bigutta Holland, 1893
Euproctis crocata (Boisduval, 1847)
Euproctis crocosticta Hampson, 1905
Euproctis neavei Tams, 1924
Euproctis pallida (Kirby, 1896)
Euproctis terminalis (Walker, 1854)
Euproctoides acrisia Plötz, 1880
Heteronygmia dissimilis Aurivillius, 1910
Homochira rendalli (Distant, 1897)
Hyaloperina vitrina Hering, 1926
Lacipa bizonoides Butler, 1893
Lacipa gracilis Hopffer, 1857
Laelia curvivirgata Karsch, 1895
Laelia municipalis Distant, 1897
Lepidolacipa venosata Hering, 1926
Leptaroa ochricoloria Strand, 1911
Leptaroa paupera Hering, 1926
Ogoa neavei Rothschild, 1916
Otroeda aino (Bryk, 1915)
Pirgula atrinotata (Butler, 1897)
Polymona rufifemur Walker, 1855
Pteredoa usebia (Swinhoe, 1903)
Stilpnaroma venosa Hering, 1926
Stracena bananae (Butler, 1897)

Metarbelidae
Arbelodes claudiae Lehmann, 2010
Kroonia murphyi Lehmann, 2010
Kroonia natalica (Hampson, 1910)
Metarbela bipuncta Hampson, 1920
Metarbela dialeuca Hampson, 1910
Metarbela erecta Gaede, 1929
Metarbela vaualba Hampson, 1920
Ortharbela bisinuata (Hampson, 1920)
Ortharbela minima (Hampson, 1920)
Salagena albicilia Hampson, 1920
Salagena violetta Gaede, 1929
Teragra tristicha Hampson, 1920

Noctuidae
Aburina coerulescens Hampson, 1926
Aburina poliophaea Hampson, 1926
Achaea catella Guenée, 1852
Achaea ferreotincta Hampson, 1918
Achaea lienardi (Boisduval, 1833)
Achaea rothkirchi (Strand, 1914)
Acontia hampsoni Hacker, Legrain & Fibiger, 2008
Acontia leucotrigona (Hampson, 1905)
Acontia nephele Hampson, 1911
Acontia paratrigona Hacker, Legrain & Fibiger, 2008
Aegocera fervida (Walker, 1854)
Aegocera meneta (Cramer, 1775)
Anoba microphaea Hampson, 1926
Anomis endochlora Hampson, 1926
Anomis polymorpha Hampson, 1926
Antarchaea straminea Hampson, 1926
Asota speciosa (Drury, 1773)
Attatha ethiopica Hampson, 1910
Baniana sminthochroa Hampson, 1926
Bocula metochrea Hampson, 1926
Brephos nyassana (Bartel, 1903)
Calliodes pretiosissima Holland, 1892
Callyna nigerrima Hampson, 1902
Cerynea albivitta Hampson, 1918
Chaetostephana inclusa (Karsch, 1895)
Chaetostephana rendalli (Rothschild, 1896)
Chrysodeixis acuta (Walker, [1858])
Chrysozonata latiflavaria (Swinhoe, 1904)
Condica conducta (Walker, 1857)
Conservula cinisigna de Joannis, 1906
Cortyta setifera Hampson, 1918
Crameria amabilis (Drury, 1773)
Crypsotidia maculifera (Staudinger, 1898)
Cyligramma latona (Cramer, 1775)
Cyligramma limacina (Guérin-Méneville, 1832)
Cyligramma magus (Guérin-Méneville, [1844])
Deinypena nyasana Hampson, 1926
Digama budonga Bethune-Baker, 1913
Dysgonia angularis (Boisduval, 1833)
Dysgonia derogans (Walker, 1858)
Dysgonia properans (Walker, 1858)
Dysgonia proxima (Hampson, 1902)
Dysgonia torrida (Guenée, 1852)
Dysgonia triplocyma (Hampson, 1913)
Egybolis vaillantina (Stoll, 1790)
Entomogramma pardus Guenée, 1852
Episparis charassota Hampson, 1926
Episparis homoeosema Hampson, 1926
Erebus walkeri (Butler, 1875)
Ethiopica asteropa Hampson, 1909
Eublemma anachoresis (Wallengren, 1863)
Eublemma apicata Distant, 1898
Eublemma baccalix (Swinhoe, 1886)
Eublemma cochylioides (Guenée, 1852)
Eublemma exanimis Hampson, 1918
Eublemma flavescens Hampson, 1918
Eublemma quadrilineata Moore, 1881
Eublemma scitula (Rambur, 1833)
Eublemma tritonia (Hampson, 1902)
Eucampima atritornalis Hampson, 1926
Eudocima materna (Linnaeus, 1767)
Eulocastra carnibasalis Hampson, 1918
Eulocastra pallida Hampson, 1918
Eulocastra poliogramma Hampson, 1918
Eustrotia obliquisignata Hampson, 1918
Eustrotia rubrisignata Hampson, 1918
Eutelia polychorda Hampson, 1902
Euxoa cymograpta Hampson, 1918
Fodina johnstoni Butler, 1897
Geniascota patagiata Hampson, 1926
Gesonia obeditalis Walker, 1859
Gesonia stictigramma Hampson, 1926
Grammodes congenita Walker, 1858
Grammodes exclusiva Pagenstecher, 1907
Grammodes geometrica (Fabricius, 1775)
Grammodes stolida (Fabricius, 1775)
Haemaphlebia phaeomicta Hampson, 1918
Heliophisma klugii (Boisduval, 1833)
Heraclia africana (Butler, 1875)
Heraclia butleri (Walker, 1869)
Heraclia elongata (Bartel, 1903)
Heraclia jugans (Jordan, 1913)
Heraclia perdix (Druce, 1887)
Heraclia superba (Butler, 1875)
Herpeperas violaris Hampson, 1926
Hespagarista caudata (Dewitz, 1879)
Homaea striatalis Hampson, 1918
Hypopyra capensis Herrich-Schäffer, 1854
Hypopyra rufescens (Kirby, 1896)
Hyposada carneotincta Hampson, 1918
Hyposada hydrocampata (Guenée, 1858)
Hyssia pallidicosta Hampson, 1918
Leoniloma convergens Hampson, 1926
Leucania homoeoptera (Hampson, 1918)
Leucania longipennis (Hampson, 1905)
Leucovis alba (Rothschild, 1897)
Libystica crenata Hampson, 1926
Lophocyttarra argyropasta Hampson, 1918
Lophonotidia nocturna Hampson, 1901
Lophoptera litigiosa (Boisduval, 1833)
Marcipa mediana Hampson, 1926
Marcipa phaeodonta Hampson, 1926
Marcipa ruptisigna Hampson, 1926
Masalia flavistrigata (Hampson, 1903)
Masalia galatheae (Wallengren, 1856)
Maxera brachypecten Hampson, 1926
Mazuca strigicincta Walker, 1866
Mentaxya albifrons (Geyer, 1837)
Mentaxya ignicollis (Walker, 1857)
Mesogenea costimacula Hampson, 1926
Micragrotis nigrisigna Hampson, 1911
Mitrophrys menete (Cramer, 1775)
Mocis frugalis (Fabricius, 1775)
Mocis mayeri (Boisduval, 1833)
Mocis mutuaria (Walker, 1858)
Nagia sacerdotis Hampson, 1926
Nyodes rufifusa (Hampson, 1918)
Oglasa parallela Hampson, 1926
Oglasodes nyasica Hampson, 1926
Omphaloceps daria (Druce, 1895)
Ophiusa hypoxantha (Hampson, 1918)
Ophiusa mejanesi (Guenée, 1852)
Ophiusa tettensis (Hopffer, 1857)
Ozarba domina (Holland, 1894)
Ozarba fasciata (Wallengren, 1860)
Ozarba lepida Saalmüller, 1891
Ozarba nigroviridis (Hampson, 1902)
Ozarba toxotis Hampson, 1910
Pandesma quenavadi Guenée, 1852
Pangrapta melacleptra Hampson, 1926
Parachalciope mahura (Felder & Rogenhofer, 1874)
Paralephana argyresthia Hampson, 1926
Phaegorista formosa Butler, 1877
Phaegorista xanthosoma Hampson, 1910
Phaegorista zebra Butler, 1897
Plecopterodes moderata (Wallengren, 1860)
Pleuronodes plexifera Hampson, 1926
Plusiodonta euchalcia Hampson, 1926
Plusiophaes thermotis (Hampson, 1926)
Polydesma umbricola Boisduval, 1833
Pseudogyrtona nigrivitta Hampson, 1926
Pseudopais nigrobasalis Bartel, 1903
Pseudospiris paidiformis Butler, 1895
Rhanidophora odontophora Hampson, 1926
Rhesala nyasica Hampson, 1926
Rhynchina leucodonta Hampson, 1910
Rivula endotricha Hampson, 1926
Rivula ethiopina Hampson, 1926
Rivula lophosoma Hampson, 1926
Rothia panganica Karsch, 1898
Saalmuellerana rufimixta (Hampson, 1918)
Sphingomorpha chlorea (Cramer, 1777)
Spirama glaucescens (Butler, 1893)
Taveta eucosmia Hampson, 1926
Thiacidas fasciata (Fawcett, 1917)
Thyas meterythra (Hampson, 1918)
Thyas rubricata (Holland, 1894)
Tolna cryptoleuca Hampson, 1918
Tolna hypogrammica Hampson, 1918
Trachea oxylus (Fawcett, 1917)
Trigonodes hyppasia (Cramer, 1779)
Ulothrichopus phaeoleuca Hampson, 1913
Ulotrichopus primulina (Hampson, 1902)
Ulotrichopus variegata (Hampson, 1902)

Nolidae
Chlorozada metaleuca (Hampson, 1905)
Earias insulana (Boisduval, 1833)
Eligma duplicata Aurivillius, 1892
Maurilia arcuata (Walker, [1858])
Negeta luminosa (Walker, 1858)
Negeta nivea (Hampson, 1902)
Nola concinna (Hampson, 1918)
Nola costiplagiata (Hampson, 1918)
Ochrothripa mesopis Hampson, 1918
Odontestis striata Hampson, 1912
Pardasena punctilinea Hampson, 1918
Pardasena roeselioides (Walker, 1858)
Pardoxia graellsii (Feisthamel, 1837)
Westermannia araeogramma Hampson, 1905

Notodontidae
Anaphe johnstonei Tams, 1932
Antheua simplex Walker, 1855
Antheua trifasciata (Hampson, 1909)
Deinarchia agramma (Hampson, 1910)
Desmeocraera congoana Aurivillius, 1900
Desmeocraera decorata (Wichgraf, 1922)
Desmeocraera zombae Kiriakoff, 1958
Elaphrodes duplex (Gaede, 1928)
Epanaphe clarilla Aurivillius, 1904
Leucophalera latipennis (Butler, 1897)
Prosphoroplitis aglaurus Kiriakoff, 1955
Scalmicauda griseomaculata Gaede, 1928
Scalmicauda tessmanni (Strand, 1911)
Synete margarethae Kiriakoff, 1959
Xanthodonta xanthippa Kiriakoff, 1968

Oecophoridae
Aeolernis theatrica Meyrick, 1914
Metachanda citrodesma (Meyrick, 1911)
Parodaea scaripheuta Meyrick, 1914
Plasmatica sternitis Meyrick, 1914

Plutellidae
Plutella xylostella (Linnaeus, 1758)

Psychidae
Apaphristis themeliota Meyrick, 1915
Melasina aulodoma Meyrick, 1924
Melasina chlorotricha Meyrick, 1916
Melasina sauropa Meyrick, 1908
Monda junctimacula Hampson, 1910
Narycia fumicoma Meyrick, 1922
Narycia terricola (Meyrick, 1915)
Tretoscopa polycentra Meyrick, 1916
Typhonia amica (Meyrick, 1908)
Typhonia dissoluta (Meyrick, 1908)

Pterophoridae
Agdistis nyasa Kovtunovich & Ustjuzhanin, 2014
Apoxyptilus uzumarus Kovtunovich & Ustjuzhanin, 2014
Arcoptilia malawica Kovtunovich & Ustjuzhanin, 2014
Crassuncus colubratus (Meyrick, 1909)
Crassuncus ecstaticus (Meyrick, 1932)
Crassuncus livingstoni Kovtunovich & Ustjuzhanin, 2014
Crassuncus pacifica (Meyrick, 1911)
Deuterocopus socotranus Rebel, 1907
Exelastis crudipennis (Meyrick, 1932)
Exelastis phlyctaenias (Meyrick, 1911)
Gypsochares murphy Kovtunovich & Ustjuzhanin, 2014
Hellinsia сhewa Kovtunovich & Ustjuzhanin, 2014
Hellinsia madecasseus (Bigot, 1964)
Hellinsia namizimu Kovtunovich & Ustjuzhanin, 2014
Marasmarcha bengtssoni (Gielis, 2009)
Marasmarcha lamborni Kovtunovich & Ustjuzhanin, 2014
Marasmarcha locharcha (Meyrick, 1924)
Marasmarcha rubriacuta (Gielis, 2009)
Oxyptilus orichalcias Meyrick, 1916
Picardia leza Kovtunovich & Ustjuzhanin, 2014
Picardia raymondi Kovtunovich & Ustjuzhanin, 2014
Picardia tumbuka Kovtunovich & Ustjuzhanin, 2014
Platyptilia farfarellus Zeller, 1867
Platyptilia mugesse Kovtunovich & Ustjuzhanin, 2014
Prichotilus tara Ustjuzhanin and Kovtunovich, 2011
Procapperia insomnis (Townsend, 1956)
Pterophorus albidus (Zeller, 1852)
Pterophorus dallastai Gielis, 1991
Pterophorus spissa (Bigot, 1969)
Pterophorus rhyparias (Meyrick, 1907)
Sphenarches anisodactylus (Walker, 1864)
Sphenarches bifurcatus Gielis, 2009
Sphenarches mulanje Kovtunovich & Ustjuzhanin, 2014
Stenodacma cognata Gielis, 2009
Stenoptilia juniper Kovtunovich & Ustjuzhanin, 2014
Stenoptilia viettei Gibeaux, 1994

Pyralidae
Corcyra cephalonica (Stainton, 1866)
Lamoria imbella (Walker, 1864)
Pyralosis polycyclophora (Hampson, 1916)

Saturniidae
Adafroptilum incana (Sonthonnax, 1899)
Antistathmoptera rectangulata Pinhey, 1968
Athletes gigas (Sonthonnax, 1902)
Athletes semialba (Sonthonnax, 1904)
Aurivillius seydeli Rougeot, 1962
Bunaeopsis aurantiaca (Rothschild, 1895)
Bunaeopsis hersilia (Westwood, 1849)
Bunaeopsis jacksoni (Jordan, 1908)
Campimoptilum kuntzei (Dewitz, 1881)
Cinabra hyperbius (Westwood, 1881)
Cirina forda (Westwood, 1849)
Decachorda pomona (Weymer, 1892)
Decachorda rosea Aurivillius, 1898
Epiphora antinorii (Oberthür, 1880)
Gonimbrasia rectilineata (Sonthonnax, 1899)
Gonimbrasia wahlbergii (Boisduval, 1847)
Gynanisa maja (Klug, 1836)
Holocerina agomensis (Karsch, 1896)
Holocerina angulata (Aurivillius, 1893)
Holocerina rhodesiensis (Janse, 1918)
Holocerina smilax (Westwood, 1849)
Imbrasia ertli Rebel, 1904
Lobobunaea angasana (Westwood, 1849)
Ludia delegorguei (Boisduval, 1847)
Ludia dentata (Hampson, 1891)
Ludia orinoptena Karsch, 1892
Melanocera sufferti (Weymer, 1896)
Micragone ansorgei (Rothschild, 1907)
Micragone cana (Aurivillius, 1893)
Micragone gaetani Bouyer, 2008
Micragone nyasae Rougeot, 1962
Nudaurelia dione (Fabricius, 1793)
Nudaurelia gueinzii (Staudinger, 1872)
Nudaurelia lucida (Rothschild, 1907)
Nudaurelia macrops Rebel, 1917
Nudaurelia macrothyris (Rothschild, 1906)
Nudaurelia nyassana (Rothschild, 1907)
Nudaurelia rhodina (Rothschild, 1907)
Orthogonioptilum adiegetum Karsch, 1892
Pseudaphelia apollinaris (Boisduval, 1847)
Pseudimbrasia deyrollei (J. Thomson, 1858)
Pseudobunaea cyrene Weymer, 1908
Pseudobunaea irius (Fabricius, 1793)
Pseudobunaea tyrrhena (Westwood, 1849)
Tagoropsiella mulanjensis Darge, 2008
Tagoropsis hanningtoni (Butler, 1883)
Ubaena dolabella (Druce, 1886)
Urota conjuncta Bouvier, 1930
Urota sinope (Westwood, 1849)
Usta terpsichore (Maassen & Weymer, 1885)

Sesiidae
Chamaesphecia ethiopica Hampson, 1919
Chamanthedon leucocera Hampson, 1919
Homogyna albicincta Hampson, 1919
Hypanthedon marisa (Druce, 1899)
Macrotarsipus albipunctus Hampson, 1893
Macrotarsipus microthyris Hampson, 1919
Melittia aureosquamata (Wallengren, 1863)
Melittia natalensis Butler, 1874
Melittia oedipus Oberthür, 1878
Melittia pyropis Hampson, 1919
Monopetalotaxis chalciphora Hampson, 1919
Paranthrene thalassina Hampson, 1919
Podosesia surodes Hampson, 1919
Pseudomelittia berlandi Le Cerf, 1917
Pyranthrene flammans Hampson, 1919
Sura pyrocera Hampson, 1919
Sura ruficauda (Rothschild, 1911)
Synanthedon flavipalpis (Hampson, 1910)
Thyranthrene squamata Gaede, 1929
Tipulamima sexualis (Hampson, 1910)
Tipulamima sophax (Druce, 1899)

Sphingidae
Acanthosphinx guessfeldti (Dewitz, 1879)
Afroclanis calcareus (Rothschild & Jordan, 1907)
Antinephele maculifera Holland, 1889
Basiothia medea (Fabricius, 1781)
Cephonodes hylas (Linnaeus, 1771)
Chaerocina dohertyi Rothschild & Jordan, 1903
Dovania poecila Rothschild & Jordan, 1903
Falcatula falcata (Rothschild & Jordan, 1903)
Hippotion gracilis (Butler, 1875)
Hippotion roseipennis (Butler, 1882)
Leucophlebia afra Karsch, 1891
Likoma apicalis Rothschild & Jordan, 1903
Macroglossum trochilus (Hübner, 1823)
Neopolyptychus compar (Rothschild & Jordan, 1903)
Nephele bipartita Butler, 1878
Nephele funebris (Fabricius, 1793)
Nephele lannini Jordan, 1926
Nephele rosae Butler, 1875
Phylloxiphia metria (Jordan, 1920)
Platysphinx piabilis (Distant, 1897)
Polyptychopsis marshalli (Rothschild & Jordan, 1903)
Polyptychus coryndoni Rothschild & Jordan, 1903
Temnora elegans (Rothschild, 1895)
Temnora griseata Rothschild & Jordan, 1903
Temnora iapygoides (Holland, 1889)
Temnora marginata (Walker, 1856)
Temnora zantus (Herrich-Schäffer, 1854)
Theretra capensis (Linnaeus, 1764)

Thyrididae
Arniocera chalcopasta Hampson, 1910
Arniocera erythropyga (Wallengren, 1860)
Arniocera zambesina (Walker, 1866)
Chrysotypus tessellata (Warren, 1908)
Dilophura caudata (Jordan, 1907)
Dysodia constellata Warren, 1908
Dysodia vitrina (Boisduval, 1829)
Gnathodes helvella Whalley, 1971
Netrocera diffinis Jordan, 1907
Netrocera hemichrysa (Hampson, 1910)

Tineidae
Acridotarsa melipecta (Meyrick, 1915)
Amphixystis colubrina (Meyrick, 1914)
Amphixystis epirota (Meyrick, 1914)
Amphixystis serrata (Meyrick, 1914)
Cimitra spinignatha (Gozmány, 1968)
Criticonoma phalacropis (Meyrick, 1915)
Edosa montanata (Gozmány, 1968)
Edosa phlegethon (Gozmány, 1968)
Emblematodes cyanochra Meyrick, 1914
Hapsifera marmarota Meyrick, 1914
Hapsifera septica Meyrick, 1908
Hyperbola moschias (Meyrick, 1914)
Hyperbola zicsii Gozmány, 1965
Leptonoma citrozona Meyrick, 1916
Machaeropteris histurga Meyrick, 1915
Machaeropteris irritabilis Meyrick, 1932
Opogona phaeocrana Meyrick, 1914
Opogona plumbifera (Meyrick, 1914)
Opogona zophocrana Meyrick, 1915
Pachypsaltis pachystoma (Meyrick, 1920)
Perissomastix acutibasis Gozmány, 1968
Perissomastix dentifera Gozmány & Vári, 1973
Perissomastix fulvicoma (Meyrick, 1921)
Perissomastix montis Gozmány, 1968
Phthoropoea oenochares (Meyrick, 1920)
Pitharcha chalinaea Meyrick, 1908
Scalmatica rigens (Meyrick, 1916)
Sphallestasis biclavata (Gozmány, 1968)
Sphallestasis exarata (Gozmány, 1968)
Tinea sporoptera Gozmány, 1968
Tinea subalbidella Stainton, 1867
Trichophaga tapetzella (Linnaeus, 1767)
Wegneria acervalis (Meyrick, 1914)

Tortricidae
Acroclita trichocnemis Meyrick, 1914
Afroploce karsholti Aarvik, 2004
Bactra endea Diakonoff, 1963
Bactra rhabdonoma Diakonoff, 1963
Bactra stagnicolana Zeller, 1852
Capua ptilocrossa Meyrick, 1914
Capua pusillana (Walker, 1863)
Cnephasia melliflua Meyrick, 1914
Cosmorrhyncha acrocosma (Meyrick, 1908)
Cryptophlebia peltastica (Meyrick, 1921)
Cydia heptacopa (Meyrick, 1916)
Cydia reflectrix (Meyrick, 1928)
Eccopsis incultana (Walker, 1863)
Eccopsis wahlbergiana Zeller, 1852
Epichorista phaeocoma Meyrick, 1914
Eucosma sandycitis Meyrick, 1916
Metendothenia balanacma (Meyrick, 1914)
Multiquaestia kingstoni Aarvik & Karisch, 2009
Multiquaestia skulei Aarvik & Karisch, 2009
Olethreutes calchantis (Meyrick, 1914)
Olethreutes iorrhoa (Meyrick, 1914)
Tortrix dinota Meyrick, 1918
Tortrix entherma Meyrick, 1914
Tortrix platystega Meyrick, 1920

Uraniidae
Gathynia auratiplaga Warren, 1901

Zygaenidae
Astyloneura meridionalis (Hampson, 1920)
Metanycles flavibasis Hampson, 1920
Saliunca assimilis Jordan, 1907
Saliunca metacyanea Hampson, 1920
Syringura triplex (Plötz, 1880)
Tasema fulvithorax Hampson, 1920

References 

Kovtunovich, Ustejuzhanin & Murphy, 2014. Plume moths of Malawi (Lepidoptera: Pterophoridae). Zootaxa 3847 (4): 451–494 (11 August 2014) (abstract)

External links 

Moths
Moths
Malawi
Malawi